The 2019–20 Süper Lig, officially called the Süper Lig Cemil Usta season, was the 62nd season of the Süper Lig, the highest tier football league of Turkey. The season was named after Cemil Usta, a former Turkish national team player and Trabzonspor legend. Galatasaray were the defending champions. Due to the coronavirus pandemic, The Ministry of Youth and Sports announced on 12 March 2020 that matches would be played behind closed doors until the end of April, before indefinitely suspending matches altogether on 19 March. After a hiatus of nearly three months, the season resumed behind closed doors on 12 June 2020, with eight rounds still to play. The season ended with matches played on 26 July 2020, and without relegations.

Teams
A total of 18 teams contested the league, including 15 sides from the 2018–19 season and three promoted from the 2018–19 TFF First League. It included Denizlispor and Gençlerbirliği, the top two teams from the TFF First League, and Gaziantep, the winners of the 2018–19 TFF First League playoffs.
Akhisarspor, BB Erzurumspor, and Bursaspor were relegated to the 2019–20 TFF First League. Gençlerbirliği made an immediate return to the top level, Denizlispor returned to it after 9 years and Gaziantep made their debut. Erzurum BB were immediately relegated to the second level. Akhisarspor ended 7 years at the top level. Bursaspor were relegated after spending 13 years in the top flight. During this period, they were champions of the 2009–10 Süper Lig.

Stadiums and locations

Göztepe played their matches at the Bornova Stadium half-season.

Personnel and sponsorship

Managerial changes

League table

Results

Statistics

Top goalscorers

Top assists

Hat-tricks

4 Player scored four goals

Awards

Annual awards

References

External links

 

 

Turk
1
Super Lig
Süper Lig seasons